Hugh M. Cummings High School  (commonly known as Cummings High School)  is a public high school serving grades 9–12 in Burlington, North Carolina, and is a part of the Alamance-Burlington School System. The school opened in 1970 and serves the east side of the city. The school is currently a part of the Mid-State 2A conference.

Athletics

Cummings is also the home to multiple team state champions in football, basketball and track.  The "Cavaliers" brought home four state championships in 2007 alone, including football, men's basketball, and stand out women's indoor track, women's outdoor track. Brandon Tate, an alumnus of the school, was drafted in the third round of the 2009 NFL Draft by the New England Patriots. The Cavaliers won the state 3A championship in football in 1988, 1990, and 1992. These teams were led by Coach Dave Gutshall and Quarterbacks Chuckie Burnette, Donnie Davis, and Ernest Tinnin, who all have their numbers 11, 10, and 15 retired in the schools gymnasium. The football team also won the 2A championship in 2002 and 2006.

See also 
 List of high schools in North Carolina

References

External links 
 School website
 publicschoolreview.com

Schools in Alamance County, North Carolina
Cummings High School, Hugh M